This is the list of cathedrals in Germany sorted by denomination.

Some pre-Reformation cathedrals in Germany, now within one of the Lutheran or united Evangelical churches (co-operating in their umbrella organisation Evangelical Church in Germany) still retain the term cathedral, despite the churches Presbyterian polity which does not have bishops (in some Protestant churches) or use the term as a merely honorary title and function, void of any hierarchical supremacy. As cathedrals are often particularly impressive edifices, the term is often used incorrectly as a designation for any large, important church. This is especially true in Berlin, where three Protestant church buildings, which never functioned as cathedrals, are colloquially called cathedral, and Frankfurt Cathedral (German: Dom; cf. Berliner Dom, Deutscher Dom and Französischer Dom, Kaiserdom).

Roman Catholic
Cathedrals of the Roman Catholic church in Germany:
 Imperial Cathedral of Our Lady in Aachen 1
 Cathedral of Our Lady Visitation and the Most Sacred Heart of Jesus in Augsburg
Co-cathedral Basilica of Sts. Peter and Paul in Dillingen
 Imperial Cathedral of Sts. Peter and Paul and St. George in Bamberg 1
 Cathedral Basilica of St. Hedwig in Berlin
Cathedral of the Holy Trinity in Dresden
Co-cathedral of St. Peter in Bautzen
 Cathedral of Our Lady of Assumption in Eichstätt
 Cathedral of St. Mary in Erfurt
Cathedral of the Holy Trinity, Sts. Mary, Cosmas and Damian in Essen
Cathedral of Our Lady in Freiburg
 Fulda Cathedral in Fulda
 Cathedral of St. James in Görlitz
Cathedral of St. Mary in Hamburg
 Cathedral of the Assumption of Mary in Hildesheim 1
Basilica of St. John the Baptist Patron of Breslavia in Berlin (of the Military Ordinariate of Germany)
 Colonge Cathedral in Cologne 1
 Cathedral of St. George and St. Nicholas in Limburg an der Lahn
 Cathedral of St. Sebastian in Magdeburg
 Imperial Cathedral of St. Martin of Tours and St. Stephen in Mainz
 Cathedral of Our Lady in Munich
Co-Cathedral of Our Lady's Nativity, Sts. Corbinian, Lantpert, Nonnosus and Sigismund in Freising
Cathedral of the Intercession of the Mother of God and of St. Andrew in Munich (of the Ukrainian Catholic Apostolic Exarchate of Germany and Scandinavia)
Cathedral of St. Paul in Münster
 Cathedral of St. Peter in Osnabrück
 Paderborn Cathedral in Paderborn
Cathedral of St. Stephen in Passau
 Cathedral of St. Peter in Regensburg 1
 Cathedral of St. Martin in Rottenburg
Co-cathedral Church of St. Eberhard in Stuttgart
 Imperial Cathedral Basilica of Our Lady of the Assumption and St. Stephen in Speyer 1
 Cathedral of St. Peter in Trier 1
 Cathedral of Sts. Kilian, Colonat and Totnan in Würzburg

1 World Heritage Site in Germany

Eastern Orthodox
Eastern Orthodox cathedrals in Germany:
 Resurrection of Christ Cathedral in Berlin (Russian Orthodox)
 St. Boris Cathedral in Berlin (Bulgarian Orthodox)
 Hagia Trias Metropolitan Cathedral in Bonn (Greek Orthodox Patriarchate of Constantinople)
 St. Mary's Dormition Cathedral in Himmelsthür, Hildesheim (Serbian Orthodox)
 Metropolitan Cathedral in Nuremberg (Romanian Orthodox)

Evangelical Church in Germany cathedrals

Evangelical Church in Germany cathedrals in Germany:
 Cathedral Church of St. Peter, Bremen 
 Cathedral Church of St. Mary, Fürstenwalde
 Minster Church of Our Lady, Konstanz
 Cathedral Church of Ss. John the Baptist, Blaise, Mary and Nicholas, Lübeck 1
 Imperial Cathedral Church of Ss. Maurice and Catherine, Magdeburg
 Cathedral Church of Ss. Peter and Paul, Naumburg 1
 
 Schwerin Cathedral, Schwerin
 Cathedral of Ss. Blaise and John the Baptist, Braunschweig
 Church of St Stephen and St Sixtus, Halberstadt 
 St. Mary's Cathedral, Hamburg, Hamburg
 St. Michael's Church, Hamburg, Hamburg
 Market Church of Ss. George and James, Hanover
 Meissen Cathedral or Church of St John and St Donatus, Meissen
 Merseburg Cathedral or Dom St. Johannes und St. Laurentius, Merseburg
 Cathedral of St. Peter at Schleswig, Schleswig
 Stiftskirche, Stuttgart, Stuttgart
 Cathedral Church of St. John, Mainz
 Imperial Cathedral Church of St. Peter, Worms

1 World Heritage Site in Germany

See also

Lists of cathedrals by country
Imperial Cathedrals

References

Cathedrals in Germany
Germany
Cath
Catherals